"Deeper Down" is a song by British doom metal band My Dying Bride, released on 18 September 2006. It is an edited version of the song which appears on the album A Line of Deathless Kings.

"Deeper Down" contains two other tracks; "The Child of Eternity", an exclusive track not featured on the album, as it is more in tune with the band's earlier death metal style, and a live audio version of "A Kiss to Remember", as featured on My Dying Bride's Sinamorata DVD.

A video for "Deeper Down" is featured on the limited edition of A Line of Deathless Kings. It was directed by Charlie Granberg, who also directed Katatonia's videos for "My Twin" and "Deliberation".

Track listing
"Deeper Down" (Uberdoom edit) – 3:50
"The Child of Eternity" – 4:16
"A Kiss to Remember" (Live) – 7:22

Personnel
 Aaron Stainthorpe - vocals 
 Adrian Jackson - bass 
 Hamish Glencross - guitar
 Andrew Craighan - guitar 
 Sarah Stanton - keyboards
 John Bennett - drums
 Shaun Taylor-Steels - drums on track 3

References

2006 singles
My Dying Bride songs
2006 songs